is a Japanese manga written by Hitoshi Okuda and serialised in Dragon Magazine from 1994 to 1999. The individual chapters were published in six bound volumes by Fujimi Shobo.

The manga was adapted into a 3-episode original video animation, created by J.C.Staff and directed by Akiyuki Shinbo. The 3 episodes were released in Japan between December 1, 1997, and May 21, 1998. In the United States the OVA was released by AnimeWorks, a division of Media Blasters, in May 2004.

Characters

Media

Manga
Fujimi Shobo published the manga's six tankōbon between January 1994 and December 1998.

Volume listing

OVAs
The OVAs uses two pieces of theme music.

On May 25, 2004, AnimeWorks released a DVD containing the three OVAs.

Reception
Anime News Network's Bamboo Dong criticised the OVAs for taking "every fantasy stereotype and embraces it, making no pretence of the fact that they're trying to milk every cliché".

References

External links

1997 anime OVAs
Comedy anime and manga
Fantasy anime and manga
Fujimi Shobo manga
J.C.Staff
Shōnen manga